The 2014 season for  began in January at the Tour de San Luis. As a UCI ProTeam, they were automatically invited and obligated to send a squad to every event in the UCI World Tour.

2014 roster

Riders who joined the team for the 2014 season

Riders who left the team during or after the 2013 season

Season victories

Footnotes

References

2014 road cycling season by team
2014 in Spanish road cycling
Movistar Team (men's team)